Kamid el-Loz, also spelled Kamid al-Lawz, is located in West Bekaa, Lebanon. The settlement has a population numbering several thousand, mostly Sunni, people and is also a site of archaeological excavations.

History
In 1838, Eli Smith noted  Kamid el-Lauz  as a Sunni Muslim village in the Beqaa Valley.
The ancient name of the site is thought to be Kumidi.

Archaeology
Tell Kamid el-Loz was the site of major German archaeological excavations between 1963 and 1981. One of the most important sites in Lebanon where archaeologists found and recorded many spectacular buildings, which are very important to the history of the region. Paleolithic material was found alongside Heavy Neolithic on through to the late Neolithic period, becoming a human settlement during the Bronze Age and continuing until the Byzantine era, a German team from the University of Freiburg has conducted more recent excavations and studies.

Numerous urban structures such as defense systems, temples, palaces, private dwellings, workshops and cemeteries were uncovered. Archaeologists also found everyday objects such as pottery, as well as jewelry and other luxury items.

Cuneiform tablets
Probably the most important finds were documents written in cuneiform script on clay tablets dated to the 14th century BC. The village of Kamed el-Loz lies on top of settlements built in the Achaemenid, Hellenistic and Roman periods. The site has been determined to be the city of Kumidi in the Amarna letters. It was used as a residence to Egyptian officials to oversee the southern Levantine kings for the pharaoh.

South of the village we find a necropolis or burial place that also dates to this era. Just outside Kamed El-Loz is a large Umayyad quarry visible from the road. Rock-cut tombs can be seen here, as well as Aramaic inscriptions. The quarry provided stones for the eighth-century city of Anjar and was worked by Eastern Christians from Iraq who were brought to the Beqaa for this purpose.

The site showed a direct transition from Paleolithic material which was mixed with flints from an aceramic, vigorous culture, little recorded in the archaeological record called the Qaraoun culture inhabiting the area at the start of the Neolithic Revolution. Heavy Neolithic flints from this culture collected here included scrapers, picks and axes along with a large amount of debris.

See also
List of cities of the ancient Near East

References

Bibliography

Further reading
 Penner, Silvia, Kāmid el-Lōz 19. Die Keramik der Spätbronzezeit: Tempelanlagen T3 bis T1, Palastanlagen P5 bis P1/2, Königsgrab ("Schatzhaus") und "Königliche Werkstatt", Saarbrücker Beiträge zur Altertumskunde 63, Bonn: R. Habelt, 2006.
 Huehnergard, John, “A Byblos Letter, Probably from Kamid el-Loz”, ZA 86, pp. 97–113, 1996.
 Lilyquist, Christine, “Objects Attributable to Kāmid el-Lōz and Comments on the Date of Objects in the ‘Schatzhaus’”, in Adler, W. (ed.), Kāmid el-Lōz 11 – Das ‘Schatzhaus’ im Palastbereich: Die Befunde des Königsgrabes, Saarbrücker Beiträge zur Altertumskunde 47, Bonn: Habelt, pp. 207–220, 1994.
 Lilyquist, Christine, “Stone Vessels at Kāmid el-Lōz, Lebanon: Egyptian, Egyptianizing or Non-Egyptian? A Question at Sites from the Sudan to Iraq to the Greek Mainland”, in Hachmann, R. (ed.), Kāmid el-Lōz 16 – ‘Schatzhaus’-Studien, Saarbrücker Beiträge zur Altertumskunde 59, Bonn: Habelt, pp. 133–73, 1996.
 Maurer, Alfred Werner., “Reise in den Orient zur Grabung Kamid el-Loz, Lebanon 1973”, Philologus Verlag Basel(ch)2006.
 Hachmann, Rolf., “Kāmid el-Lōz und die Amarna-Zeit oder vom Sinn und Unsinn der Kulturgeschichte und ihrer Erforschung” Saarbrücken 1972.
 Hachmann, Rolf, “Der Palast eines syrischen Kleinkönigs der späten Bronzezeit in Kāmid el-Lōz” in: D. Papenfuss u. V. M. Strocka (Hrsg.): Palast und Hütte. Beiträge zum Bauen und Wohnen im Altertum von Archäologen, Vor- und Frühgeschichtlern. Mainz: pp. 21–41, 1982.
 Hachmann, Rolf (Hrsg.), “Frühe Phöniker im Libanon – 20 Jahre Ausgrabung in Kāmid el-Lōz” Institut für Vor- und Frühgeschichte und Vorderasiatische Archäologie der Universität des Saarlandes, Saarbrücken 1983,  u.  (Museumsausgabe).

External links
Kamed El Laouz, Localiban
Kāmid el-Lōz. Institut für Vor- und Frühgeschichte und Vorderasiatische Archäologie Informationen zu den Grabungen 1963–1981.
inclut des liens vers les rapports annuels d'excavation de Kamid el-Loz (allemand)

Populated places in Western Beqaa District
Sunni Muslim communities in Lebanon

Beqaa Valley
Great Rift Valley
Archaeological sites in Lebanon
Amarna letters locations
Phoenician cities